Nikita Osipov (born April 22, 1984) is a Belarusian ice hockey player. He is currently playing with the HC Dinamo Minsk of the Kontinental Hockey League (KHL).

Osipov played in the KHL with HC Sibir Novosibirsk during the 2012–13 season.

International
Osipov was named to the Belarus men's national ice hockey team for competition at the 2014 IIHF World Championship.

Career statistics

References

External links

1984 births
Living people
Sportspeople from Samara, Russia
Belarusian ice hockey forwards
HC CSK VVS Samara players
HC Dinamo Minsk players
HC MVD players
HK Neman Grodno players
HC Sibir Novosibirsk players
Metallurg Zhlobin players
Motor Barnaul players
Toros Neftekamsk players